Ruoff is a surname. Notable people with the surname include:

Alex Ruoff (born 1986), American basketball player
A. Lavonne Brown Ruoff (born 1930), American writer and academic
Bernie Ruoff (born 1951), Canadian football player
Richard Ruoff (1883–1967), German general
Rodney S. Ruoff (born 1957), American physical chemist and nanoscience researcher